General August Winter (born 18 January 1897, Munich – 16 February 1979) was a German officer and General of mountain troops in the German army during World War II.

Career
Winter joined the Imperial German Army as an officer cadet in 1916 and was commissioned as a leutnant in 1917. He was awarded the Iron Cross second class in World War I. After 1918, he was retained in the Reichswehr. He was transferred to Munich, where he was promoted to Hauptmann in 1933 and Major in 1936. On 1 April 1939, he was promoted to Oberstleutnant and upon mobilization for World War II in the summer of 1939, he was appointed to the general staff of the army. In 1940, he was a staff officer of the Army Group South. In 1943 he became the Chief of staff of the 2nd Panzer Army and was appointed Generalmajor. In September 1943, he was stationed in Salonika as part of Army Group E. On 1 May 1945 was promoted to General der Gebirgstruppe.

In June 1946 Winter was questioned as a witness during the Nuremberg trials and then until his retirement was a researcher with the Gehlen Organization and German Federal Intelligence Service.

Awards
 Iron Cross (1914)
 2nd Class
 Honour Cross of the World War 1914/1918
 Iron Cross (1939)
 2nd Class
 1st Class
 German Cross in Gold (22 June 1942)

References
 The trial of German major war criminals, sitting at Nuremberg, Germany, 7 to 19 June 1946: one hundred and fiftieth day: Saturday, 8 June 1946". Retrieved 30 October 2011.
 James H. Critchfield; Partners at creation: the men behind postwar Germany's defense and intelligence establishment; Annapolis: Naval Institute press, 2003; P. 106/7; .

1897 births
1979 deaths
Generals of Mountain Troops
German Army personnel of World War I
People from the Kingdom of Bavaria
Military personnel from Munich
Reichswehr personnel
Recipients of the clasp to the Iron Cross, 2nd class
Recipients of the Gold German Cross
People of the Federal Intelligence Service